Dickey Elliott (born 1 January 1955) is a South African former cricketer. He played in fourteen first-class and two List A matches for Eastern Province from 1976/77 and 1979/80.

See also
 List of Eastern Province representative cricketers

References

External links
 

1955 births
Living people
South African cricketers
Eastern Province cricketers
People from Makhanda, Eastern Cape
Cricketers from the Eastern Cape